Dough is a thick paste, usually used to make an edible foodstuff.

Dough may also refer to:

 slang for money
 Dough (film), a 2015 British-Hungarian film
 "Dough" (Bottom), a 1995 TV episode of Bottoms UK TV sitcom
 The Dough, a 1970 Argentine film
 John Dough, a fictional character created by Frank L. Baum
 Jon Dough (1962–2006), U.S. pornographic actor
 van Dough family, a fictional family from Richie Rich

See also

 
 
 Doughboy (disambiguation)
 Dougher, a surname
 Philippe "Dough Man" Dauman (born 1954), U.S. businessman
 Dauwe
 Dauw
 DAUH
 Douw (disambiguation)
 Douwe
 Dau (disambiguation)
 Daw (disambiguation)
 Doe (disambiguation)
 Doh (disambiguation)
 Dou (disambiguation)
 Dow (disambiguation)
 Duh (disambiguation)